The New Era Illustrated Magazine, began in early 1900s in the United States. It was a leading American Jewish periodical (monthly), devoted to matters of interest to Jews and not the organ of any class, nor the mouthpiece of any individual. Its title was changed in 1903 from New Era Jewish Magazine when moved from Boston to New York City.

Isidor Lewi (1850-1939), a well-known journalist who served on the editorial board of the New York Tribune, was the editor and publisher of New Era Illustrated Magazine.

The magazine ran till 1935/6.

See also 
Bernard G Richards

References

External links 
 The New era illustrated magazine : Free Download, Borrow, and Streaming : Internet Archive

Cultural magazines
Jewish magazines published in the United States
Magazines established in the 1900s
Magazines disestablished in the 1930s
Magazines published in Boston
Magazines published in New York City